Guillermo Eduardo Feinmann (born 31 October 1958 in Buenos Aires) is an Argentine journalist, columnist, and lawyer. He works on Radio Rivadavia and La Nación.

He was a political columnist in the radio program El Oro y el Moro on Radio 10, and also was the host of the news program El Diario on channel C5N.

His confrontational and direct style has led him to make controversial statements. Feinmann describes himself as center-right and is against legalization of drugs and abortion;
he is also recognized as a conservative.

Studies 

At the age of  nine years became the youngest winner of the James J. Owen international competition of philately held in Miami. Later he joined the Music Conservatory of Ramos Mejía, Buenos Aires, where he studied guitar and classical singing.  In 1975 he was awarded a scholarship sponsored by the Rotary Club of Morón to continue his studies of music and French opera in Paris; the scholarship was rejected to continue studying for a law career at the University of Buenos Aires.

Controversies 
In 2006, a group of relatives of victims of the nightclub fire in Cromañón Republic (Buenos Aires) filed a complaint with the Inter-American Commission on Human Rights of the OAS on Eduardo Feinman and his boss, the television entrepreneur Daniel Hadad, due to coverage by Channel 9 and Radio 10.  
In 2007, he was also accused of defamation in the context of the García Belsunce Case.
In September 2009, during picketing at Cordoba Avenue and Junín (Buenos Aires), several university students blocked the street in support of the workers of the Kraft Foods  company (formerly Terrabusi) who had been dismissed, causing gridlock of vehicles. Feinman had an exchange with Cristian Henkel (president of the University Federation of Buenos Aires), arguing that students were violating the constitutional right to free movement: 

In September 2010, the journalist left his Twitter account, accusing its members of "mediocrity" due to a great quantity of insults he had received, and the disapproval and rejection his comments had generated in the community.

In December 2013, Feinmann lost another court case that he had filed as plaintiff against Google and Yahoo search engines. The journalist asked for an injunction to have search engine results blocked from access to his profile on social network Taringa and the corresponding encyclopedia entry on Wikipedia. The judgment on appeal (as a result of the appeal by the plaintiff) found that "to grant the requested injunction would be a restriction of thought mind restrict - in the described circumstances, in looking for, finding and disseminating information and ideas, a right guaranteed by the National Constitution, the International Covenants that are a part of it, and law 26.032, and would limit free debate that is enabled internet, that is elemental in a democratic and republican system." In particular, regarding the Wikipedia article, the Court sustained the "development of a series of descriptions of different events in which the named individual has participated in his role as a journalist, and radio and TV host. Such episodes of Feinmann's professional life are put forward as a synthesis of a series of newspaper publications that are cited as reference of what is detailed that virtual page."

Accusations against a member of the Workers Party and court judgment 

In December 2008, the Labor Party (Partido Obrero) sued Feinmann and channel C5N for 7 million pesos on behalf of Aníbal Fernández (then Chief of Cabinet of the national government), for having accused members of that party of having caused the fire of several railroad cars in Buenos Aires on September 4, 2008. At that time, the journalist had told a member of the organization who worked as a docent, surnamed Escobar, during an interview, "You teach the kids to burn trains."

Then he editorialized saying, 

For his part, the journalist mounted his defense based on the argument that he was only repeating what was said by Fernández. Nonetheless, the Labor Party said the journalist had gone beyond an informational function" through the action of adding libelous and slanderous adjectives." Five years later the courts ruled in favor of the plaintiffs and condemned Feinmann and channel C5N. The judge who issued the ruling held that Feinmann's "offensive news" constituted a "terrible damage to unjustly involve the labor party and one of its members." In addition, the judge found that the journalist " insisted on attributing to Escobar and the Labour Party the responsibility for the unfortunate events that took place, with a total disregard for finding out if it was true."

References

External links 
 Twitter

1958 births
Living people
People from Buenos Aires
Argentine Jews
Argentine journalists
Male journalists
Argentine people of German-Jewish descent